Arwel Wyn Richards (born 25 January 1982 in Carmarthen) is a Welsh businessman and columnist contributing articles on cars and style.

He has been involved in the Welsh polo scene since 2006. Working with the St. Davids Polo and Racing Club, Wales' only polo club, as tournament director, Richards hosted a beach polo day in Swansea Bay in August 2009.

From 2007 to 2009 Richards was Festival Director of the Swansea Bay Film Festival. Catherine Zeta-Jones  and  Michael Sheen were Patron and Vice President, respectively, during his tenure.

Arwel Richards has a controlled stammer and is a patron of the British Stammering Association.

References

1982 births
Living people
Sportspeople from Carmarthen
21st-century Welsh businesspeople
Welsh columnists
Welsh polo players
People with speech impediment
Film festival directors